Lucatelli is an Italian surname. Notable people with the surname include:

Adriano B. Lucatelli (born 1966), Swiss entrepreneur in the financial services industry
Giuseppe Lucatelli (1751-1828), Italian painter and architect
Marcela Lucatelli (born 1988), Brazilian composer
Pietro Lucatelli (c. 1630-after 1690), Italian painter

See also
Locatelli
Lucarelli

Italian-language surnames